Marco Crugnola and Óscar Hernández were the defending champions, but Crugnola chose not to defend 2009 title.
Hernández played with José Checa-Calvo and they were eliminated in the second round by Emilio Benfele Álvarez and Sander Groen.
Johan Brunström and Jean-Julien Rojer won the doubles competition. They won 7–6(2), 6–4 in the final, against Brian Dabul and Nicolás Massú.

Seeds

Draw

Draw

References
 Doubles Draw

Nord LB Open - Doubles
Sport in Lower Saxony
2009 Doubles